Elijah Riley (born June 12, 1998) is an American football strong safety for the Pittsburgh Steelers of the National Football League (NFL). He was signed by the Philadelphia Eagles as an undrafted free agent in 2020 following his college football career at Army.

Professional career

Philadelphia Eagles
Riley signed with the Philadelphia Eagles as an undrafted free agent following the 2020 NFL Draft on April 26, 2020. He was waived during final roster cuts on September 3, 2020, and re-signed to the team's practice squad three days later. He was elevated to the active roster on October 10 and October 17 for the team's weeks 5 and 6 games against the Pittsburgh Steelers and Baltimore Ravens, and reverted to the practice squad following each game. On December 16, 2020, Riley was promoted to the active roster.

On August 31, 2021, Riley was waived by the Eagles and re-signed to the practice squad the next day.

New York Jets
On November 9, 2021, Riley was signed by the New York Jets off the Eagles practice squad. On August 23, 2022, he was released.

Pittsburgh Steelers
On August 24, 2022, Riley was claimed off waivers by the Pittsburgh Steelers. He was waived on August 30 and signed to the practice squad the next day. He was elevated on October 8, 2022, to the Active/Inactive roster from the Steeler’s practice squad, and then reverted back to the practice squad after the game. He was promoted to the active roster on December 24, 2022.

References

External links
Philadelphia Eagles bio
Army Black Knights football bio

Further reading

1998 births
Living people
People from Port Jefferson, New York
Players of American football from New York (state)
Sportspeople from Suffolk County, New York
American football defensive backs
Army Black Knights football players
Philadelphia Eagles players
New York Jets players
Pittsburgh Steelers players